Dorcadion sodale is a species of beetle in the family Cerambycidae. It was described by Hampe in 1852. It is known from Georgia and Turkey.

Subspecies
 Dorcadion sodale var. rosti Pic, 1900
 Dorcadion sodale var. trapesunticum Breuning, 1946

References

sodale
Beetles described in 1852